The following television stations operate on virtual channel 62 in the United States:

 KAKW-DT in Killeen, Texas
 KOPX-TV in Oklahoma City, Oklahoma
 KRCA in Riverside, California
 KSMO-TV in Kansas City, Missouri
 KZOD-LD in Odessa, Texas
 WDMI-LD in Minneapolis, Minnesota
 WFPT in Frederick, Maryland
 WFPX-TV in Fayetteville, North Carolina
 WFTT-TV in Venice, Florida
 WJYS in Hammond, Indiana
 WMFP in Lawrence, Massachusetts
 WWJ-TV in Detroit, Michigan
 WWSI in Atlantic City, New Jersey
 WYCW in Asheville, North Carolina
 WYFX-LD in Youngstown, Ohio

References

62 virtual